Mohammadabad (also Romanized as Moḩammadābād) is a village in Rizab Rural District, Qatruyeh District, Neyriz County, Fars Province, Iran. At the 2006 census, its population was 62, in 14 families.

References 

Populated places in Neyriz County